Kalinovka is a rural locality (a settlement) in Novosklyuikhinsky Selsoviet, Rubtsovsky District, Altai Krai, Russia. The population was 255 as of 2013. There are 3 streets.

Geography 
Kalinovka is located 11 km east of Rubtsovsk (the district's administrative centre) by road. Vympel is the nearest rural locality.

References 

Rural localities in Rubtsovsky District